Brad Goreski (born August 15, 1977) is a Canadian-American celebrity fashion stylist and television personality. In 2015, he joined Fashion Police as a co-host. Since 2021, he has been one of the regular judges on Canada's Drag Race.

Career
Goreski moved to Los Angeles from Canada in 2003 and studied art history at the University of Southern California. He graduated from USC in 2007 with a Bachelor of Arts degree. He interned at Vogue and W magazines in New York during college. As soon as he graduated, Goreski joined Vogue's west coast staff as an assistant.

In 2008, Goreski appeared on the Rachel Zoe Project as celebrity clothing stylist Rachel Zoe's assistant.  In 2010 at age 34, he had a falling out with Zoe and struck out on his own to work as a wardrobe stylist. Goreski has worked with clients such as Kaley Cuoco, Demi Moore, Rashida Jones, Lea Michele, Keri Hilson and Shay Mitchel.

On January 12, 2012, Goreski premiered his own reality TV show on the Bravo network called It's a Brad, Brad World. The show ran for two seasons. In 2014, Goreski was named a new co-host of Fashion Police on the E! Network.

In June 2021, it was announced that Goreski would join the panel of Canada's Drag Race as a main judge, replacing Jeffrey Bowyer-Chapman and Stacey McKenzie, who announced their departures in March and June 2021, respectively.

Filmography

Published works

Awards and nominations

References

External links
 

1977 births
Living people
21st-century Canadian male writers
21st-century Canadian non-fiction writers
21st-century memoirists
American television personalities
Canadian expatriates in the United States
Canadian memoirists
Canadian people of Polish descent
Canadian television personalities
Fashion stylists
Canadian gay writers
Canadian LGBT broadcasters
American LGBT broadcasters
Gay memoirists
American gay writers
Participants in Canadian reality television series
People from Scugog
Writers from Ontario
20th-century Canadian LGBT people
21st-century Canadian LGBT people
Canadian Screen Award winners